Rumpole of the Bailey is a 1978 collection of short stories by John Mortimer about defence barrister Horace Rumpole. They were adapted from his scripts for the TV series of the same name.

The stories were:
"Rumpole and the Younger Generation"
"Rumpole and the Alternative Society"
"Rumpole and the Honourable Member"
"Rumpole and the Married Lady"
"Rumpole and the Learned Friends"
"Rumpole and the Heavy Brigade"

References

Works by John Mortimer
1978 short story collections